
In molecular biology SprD (Small pathogenicity island RNA D) is a non-coding RNA expressed on pathogenicity islands in Staphylococcus aureus. It was identified in silico along with a number of other sRNAs (SprA-G) through microarray analysis which were confirmed using a Northern blot. SprD has been found to significantly contribute to causing disease in an animal model.

Function
SprD is located between genes scn and chp in the innate immune evasion cluster (IEC) of the S. aureus genome. Its placement within this region was the first indication of a virulence-factor regulatory function.

SprD binds with sbi (Staphylococcus aureus binder of IgG) mRNA which encodes an immune evasion protein. It occludes the Shine-Dalgarno sequence and the initiation codon of sbi, forming a sbi mRNA-SprD duplex repressing the translation of the mRNA.

sbi protein interferes with the host's innate immune response by binding Factor H, Complement component 3 and IgG.

See also
 Protein A
 SprX

References

Further reading

External links

 

Non-coding RNA